Not to be confused with Igor Matovič, former Prime Minister of Slovakia.

Igor Mirović (born 12 July 1968) is a Serbian politician, economist and poet serving as the current President of the Government of Vojvodina since 2016 and before that Minister of Regional Development and Local Self-Government between 2013 and 2014.

Works
Nebo nad Vizantijom, 1994
Kremen plamen, 2003

References

|-

|-

1968 births
Living people
Politicians from Kruševac
Serbian Progressive Party politicians
Serbian Radical Party politicians
Government ministers of Vojvodina
University of Novi Sad alumni
Writers from Kruševac